Dům Radost (translated from Czech: House of Joy) is a functionalist building in Prague, Czech Republic. It is located next to Winston Churchill square in Žižkov district. It was built from 1932 to 1934. The complex serves as offices, apartments, theater, cinema, cafe and observatory since 2019. Since 1964, it is a cultural monument of the Czech Republic.

Name 
The building is historically known as Dům odborových svazů (translated as House of Trade Unions) or palác Všeobecného penzijního ústavu (translated as General Pension Administration Palace). Sometimes, it is also called as kachlíkárna (translated as Tile Factory) due to its facade.

References

External links 

 

Functionalist architecture
Office buildings completed in 1934
Žižkov
Buildings and structures in Prague
1934 establishments in Czechoslovakia
20th-century architecture in the Czech Republic